"The Scarecrow" is a song by Pink Floyd on their 1967 debut album The Piper at the Gates of Dawn, though it first appeared as the B-side of their second single "See Emily Play" (as "Scarecrow") two months before. It was written by Syd Barrett and recorded in March 1967. This song was one of several to be considered for the band's "best of" album, Echoes: The Best of Pink Floyd.

History
The song contains nascent existentialist themes, as Barrett compares his own existence to that of the scarecrow, who, while "sadder" is also "resigned to his fate".  Such thematic content would later become a mainstay of the band's lyrical imagery.  The song contains a baroque, psychedelic folk instrumental section consisting of 12-string acoustic guitar and cello.  Reflecting the experimental nature of many of the band's early psychedelic pieces, all instruments are panned to the extreme left hand and right hand sides of the stereo, with two vocal lines, one spoken and one sung. The US single (Tower 356) was released by Tower Records three times between July 1967 and late 1968. Each time it failed to duplicate its UK success.

Music videos
A promotional film for the song, made for a Pathé newsreel and filmed in early July 1967, features the band in an open field with a scarecrow, generally fooling around. It shows Roger Waters falling down as if he were shot, and Nick Mason exchanging his hat with the scarecrow's. Part of this film has been featured in Waters' live performances of "Set the Controls for the Heart of the Sun".

A second promo was filmed in 1968 in Brussels, Belgium, with David Gilmour replacing Barrett, and Waters lip-syncing while playing his Rickenbacker bass with a violin bow.

Cover versions
The industrial band Rx covered "The Scarecrow" on their album Bedside Toxicology. The vocals for the cover were provided by Nivek Ogre from Skinny Puppy.

Personnel
Syd Barrett – lead vocals, electric guitar, 6 & 12-string acoustic guitars
Richard Wright – Farfisa organ, cello, backing vocals
Roger Waters – bass guitar, bowed bass
Nick Mason – temple blocks, metal cups

References

External links
[ AMG song review]

1967 songs
Pink Floyd songs
Songs written by Syd Barrett

it:See Emily Play/The Scarecrow#The Scarecrow